Lahouari Beddiar (March 24, 1936 in Oran – September 24, 2018) was an Algerian international football player. He played as defender with MC Oran.

Honours

Clubs
MC Oran
Algerian Championship: Champion (1): 1970–71; Runners-up (2): 1967–68, 1968–69

International
Algeria
African Games: Fourth place (1): 1965

References

1936 births
2018 deaths
Footballers from Oran
Algerian footballers
Algeria international footballers
Footballers at the 1965 All-Africa Games
African Games competitors for Algeria
MC Oran players
Association football defenders
21st-century Algerian people